Lars Pleidrup (born 13 August 1981) is a Danish professional footballer who plays as a midfielder for Danish club Nykøbing FC. Due to his powerful shot from distance, he was given the nickname Krydsermissilet fra Væggerløse ("the cruise missile from Væggerløse") throughout his career and later Legende-Lars ("Lars the legend").

References

External links
 Nykøbing FC profile
Career stats at Danmarks Radio

1981 births
Living people
Danish men's footballers
Association football midfielders
Aarhus Gymnastikforening players
FC Vestsjælland players
Nykøbing FC players
Danish Superliga players
Danish 1st Division players
People from Guldborgsund Municipality
Sportspeople from Region Zealand